Yohann Auvitu (born July 27, 1989) is a French professional ice hockey defenceman for Genève-Servette HC of the National League (NL).

Playing career

Auvitu left his native France in 2008 to continue his development with JYP Jyväskylä of Finland. He logged his first minutes in Finland's top-flight Liiga during the 2010–11 season. In 2012, he claimed the Finnish championship with JYP as well as the 2013–14 edition of the European Trophy. Auvitu left JYP to sign with fellow Liiga side HIFK prior to the 2014–15 campaign. After reaching the finals with HIFK, he won the 2015–16 Pekka Rautakallio trophy as the best defenceman in the Finnish Liiga. He was the first French player to win a Liiga player award. Auvitu also competed in the Champions Hockey League with HIFK.

Auvitu signed a one-year entry-level contract with the New Jersey Devils of the National Hockey League on May 27, 2016. He made his NHL debut in the 2016–17 season opener on October 13, 2016 against the Florida Panthers where he got his first NHL point with an assist. On November 11, 2016, Auvitu scored his first NHL goal. He appeared in 25 games with the Devils before splitting the year in the AHL with affiliate, the Albany Devils.

Leaving as a free agent from the Devils in the off-season, Auvitu agreed to a one-year, one-way deal with the Edmonton Oilers on July 10, 2017. Auvitu remained with the Oilers throughout the 2017–18 season, used in a depth role Auvitu registered 3 goals and 9 points in 33 games. He played as a forward for the first time in his career in a game against the Chicago Blackhawks, on January 7, 2018.

On July 2, 2018, Auvitu left the NHL as a free agent in signing a two-year contract with Russian club, HC Sochi of the Kontinental Hockey League (KHL). In the 2018–19 season, Auvitu began in a top four defensive role on the blueline for Sochi. He registered 2 goals and 6 points in 25 games with Sochi before opting to mutually terminate his contract with the club on January 15, 2019. On January 13, 2020, he signed with Luleå HF of the Swedish Hockey League (SHL). On January 13, 2021, Auvitu was signed by his former team, HIFK of the Finnish Liiga. 

For the 2022–23 season, Auvitu was signed to a one-year contract by Neftekhimik Nizhnekamsk of the KHL on August 4, 2022. He featured in 20 regular season games with Nizhnekamsk, registering 3 points before opting to leave the club 27 November 2022. As a free agent leading into 2023, Auvitu later secured an initial one-month contract to join Swiss club, Genève-Servette HC of the NL, on 2 January 2023.

International play
Auvitu has participated in multiple editions of the IIHF World Championship beginning with the 2010 IIHF World Championship tournament as a member of the France National men's ice hockey team.

Personal life
Auvitu married Ilariia Gorelova in 2014. The couple met at the JAMK University of Applied Sciences in central Finland. The couple gave birth to their daughter, Liya Auvitu in March 2016 in Helsinki, Finland.

He is fluent in five languages – French, English, Finnish, Russian and German.

Career statistics

Regular season and playoffs

International

References

External links
 

1989 births
Living people
Albany Devils players
Edmonton Oilers players
French ice hockey defencemen
Genève-Servette HC players
HIFK (ice hockey) players
JYP Jyväskylä players
Luleå HF players
HC Neftekhimik Nizhnekamsk players
New Jersey Devils players
People from Ivry-sur-Seine
HC Sochi players
Sportspeople from Val-de-Marne
Undrafted National Hockey League players